Sukhandeep Singh (born 31 December 2001) is an Indian professional footballer who plays as a defender for I-League club Sudeva Delhi.

Club career 
Born in Dibipura village in Tehsil, Punjab. He started his career with Sant Baba Hazara Singh football Academy, Gurdaspur.

Career statistics

Club

Reference 

2001 births
Living people
Indian footballers
Sudeva Delhi FC players